The Laboulbeniaceae are a family of fungi in the order Laboulbeniales. Taxa have a widespread distribution, and are parasitic to various orders of insects.

See also
 List of Laboulbeniaceae genera

References

 
Laboulbeniomycetes genera